Inside Comedy is an American television interview program on Showtime hosted and directed by David Steinberg. During each episode, Steinberg interviews popular comedians from the worlds of stand-up, television, and film, showing clips from their careers. The show's first season ran from January 26 to March 29, 2012. Its second season premiered on February 11, 2013, and ended on April 15, 2013. The third season aired from February 3 to April 7, 2014. The first three seasons each consisted of 10 episodes. The fourth season had six episodes, premiering May 5, 2015, and ending June 9.

Production
Inside Comedy was initially intended as a feature-length documentary to be produced by Steve Carell and interviewer David Steinberg. Steinberg and Carell's company, Carousel Productions, raised several million dollars and began filming interviews. After it was decided that too much footage was shot for one film, the project was picked up as a television series by the Showtime cable TV network.

Episodes

Season 1 (2012)

Season 2 (2013)

Season 3 (2014)

Season 4 (2015)

Steinberg has also filmed interviews with Stephen Fry, Bonnie Hunt, David Koechner, Jon Lovitz, Kathy Najimy, Paula Poundstone, and Tommy Smothers.

Reception
The show's first season garnered generally positive reviews from critics. Nancy deWolf Smith of The Wall Street Journal praised Steinberg for his interviewing: "He does not focus on himself but is exquisitely tuned in to his subjects, many of whom he knows well. This seems to have relaxed some of his guests to the point where they appear more natural, and less switched on—as entertaining as that can be—than they are with other interviewers." Eric Gould of The Phoenix commented that "Steinberg's sly, understated style gave us a brilliant glimpse into comedy minds put on the spot, and artists at the top of the heap."

Neil Genzlinger of The New York Times applauded the editing exhibited in the show's premiere episode: "Mr. Seinfeld and Mr. Rickles are interviewed separately, and what makes the episode so satisfying is the way their interviews are spliced together and enhanced with clips."

At the outset of the show's second season, Don Steinberg of The Wall Street Journal commended the host's talent for interviewing: "Mr. Steinberg has an easy rapport with subjects. He stays out of their way as they jump to the good stuff, the things you imagine comedy people talk to other comedy people about."

See also
Sit Down Comedy with David Steinberg, an early and similarly-formatted TV Land series also produced and hosted by Steinberg

References

External links 
 
 

2010s American late-night television series
2012 American television series debuts
2015 American television series endings
English-language television shows
Showtime (TV network) original programming